Florida is an unincorporated community in Lafayette Township, Madison County, Indiana.

Geography

History
Florida was founded in 1856. It likely took its name from the state of Florida. A post office was established at Florida in 1864, and remained in operation until it was discontinued in 1903.

Florida was later known as Florida Station. This was based upon the train station located there in the building that was previously a post office and gas station. This small train station closed in 1956 and it was converted into the Florida Station restaurant. This restaurant remained a popular local establishment until it closed in 1978. Even though this was no longer a scheduled train stop, frieght trains continued to stop here daily for lunch.

References

Indianapolis metropolitan area
Unincorporated communities in Indiana
Unincorporated communities in Madison County, Indiana